Spun Out is a Canadian television sitcom created by Jeff Biederman, Brent Piaskoski and Brian K. Roberts for CTV. It premiered on March 6, 2014 and ended on October 3, 2015, with a total of 26 episodes over the course of 2 seasons.

Premise
The series stars Dave Foley as Dave Lyons, the head of DLPR, a public relations firm staffed with people "who can spin everybody's problems but their own". The cast also includes Paul Campbell,  Rebecca Dalton, Al Mukadam, Holly Deveaux, J. P. Manoux and Darcy Michael.

Story

First season
Episode 7, titled "Middle Aged Men in the Hall", featured guest appearances by all of Foley's Kids in the Hall colleagues — Bruce McCulloch, Mark McKinney, Scott Thompson and Kevin McDonald — as his former high school bandmates in a Goth rock band, who visited to demand that Dave honour a suicide pact that they had made in their youth.

Second season
The second season finished filming on December 5, 2014. A sneak preview of the program's season premiere was slated to air on February 1, 2015 after CTV's broadcast of Super Bowl XLIX, with the full season run slated to air beginning in March 2015.

However, on January 26, as a direct response to J. P. Manoux's arrest on voyeurism charges, CTV put the program on hiatus "indefinitely" and pulled the show from all streaming platforms. Manoux appeared in all 13 episodes, making it impossible for the network to simply air a shortened run of the series by excluding his episodes. The post-Super Bowl slot was reassigned to the season premiere of MasterChef Canada.

The network later clarified that the series was not cancelled, but would eventually air. According to network executive Phil King, "I think it’s wildly unfair that you have a whole cast of people who put their livelihood into this and we’re not going to see this because someone did something inappropriate." CTV later announced the second season of Spun Out would begin airing July 14, 2015. The premiere featured a guest appearance by comedian Russell Peters.

While there was never an official announcement of the show's cancellation, in August 2015 Foley took another full-time acting job on the American sitcom Dr. Ken, signalling the de facto demise of Spun Out. By that time the voyeurism charges against Manoux had been dropped, although he still faced charges of mischief to property. Manoux was eventually found guilty of this lesser charge in early 2017.

Cast

Main
Dave Foley as Dave Lyons, the head of DLPR
Paul Campbell as Beckett Ryan, a newly hired copywriter
Rebecca Dalton as Stephanie Lyons, Dave's daughter and DLPR employee
Holly Deveaux as Abby Hayes, Beckett's ex-girlfriend and roommate
Al Mukadam as Nelson Abrams, Beckett's friend and DLPR employee
J. P. Manoux as Bryce, Dave's executive assistant
Darcy Michael as Gordon Woolmer, a DLPR employee with an odd personality

Recurring and guest stars
Tricia Helfer as Claudia, Dave's ex-wife and Stephanie's mother
The Kids in the Hall as Dave's high school goth friends
Jason Priestley as Jacob Milton, Dave's friend and wingman
Emma Hunter in a recurring role as Daisy, a waitress
Jadyn Wong in a recurring role as Esther, an intern

Episodes

Series overview

Season 1 (2014)

Season 2 (2015)

References

External links

2014 Canadian television series debuts
2015 Canadian television series endings
2010s Canadian sitcoms
2010s Canadian workplace comedy television series
CTV Television Network original programming
Television shows filmed in Toronto
Television series by Entertainment One